Treat Conrad Huey and Dominic Inglot were the defending champions, but lost in the semifinals to Julien Benneteau and Nenad Zimonjić.
Benneteau and Zimonjić went on to win the title, defeating Mardy Fish and Radek Štěpánek in the final, 7–6(7–5), 7–5.

Seeds

Draw

Draw

References
General

Specific

Citi Open - Men's Doubles